Dario Krešić (born 11 January 1984) is a Croatian retired professional footballer who played as a goalkeeper.

Club career

Panionios
The Croatian shot-stopper spent three seasons (2006–2009) at Panionios F.C., where he made 56 appearances for the Athenian side in all competitions. He became the first-choice goalkeeper for the team in his second season, and his solid play between the posts played a crucial role in Panionios' run to the 2007–08 Super League play-offs last season.

PAOK
He moved to PAOK FC in June 2009 on a free transfer from Panionios F.C. At PAOK, Krešić was expected to challenge Greece international goalkeeper Kostas Chalkias for the starting role. While Chalkias' experience played a key role in PAOK's ability to clinch a berth in the UEFA Europa League next season, Krešić's athleticism and potential will most definitely challenge Chalkias' tenure between the goal posts. On 28 July 2010, PAOK was playing against Ajax in Amsterdam Arena and Kostas Chalkias who was injured at the 15th minute was substituted by Krešić. He played in 18 games in the 2010–11 season, as of November 2010. He was also voted MVP of the team three times.

On 27 July, when Krešić realised that he was not counted as the main goalkeeper of the team, he asked to leave from the club. PAOK released him the next day.

Lokomotiv Moscow
On 31 July 2012, Krešić signed a two-year contract with FC Lokomotiv Moscow. He made his debut for the new club on 11 August 2012 against Alania Vladikavkaz. After having made only one substitute appearance for Lokomotiv in the first part of 2013–14 season, Krešić was released by his club.

Mainz 05
On 6 January 2014, 1. FSV Mainz 05 signed Krešić for the remaining part of 2013–14 season with an option until 2016.

Bayer Leverkusen
On 23 May 2014, Krešić joined Bayer 04 Leverkusen on a free transfer, signing a two-year contract, which would keep him at the club until June 2016.

Omonia
On 20 August 2016, he signed with AC Omonia in Cyprus. He had 7 appearances with the club. On 26 May 2017 the club announced that with the end of the season the player is released.

International career
Krešić debuted for Croatia national football team on 10 September 2013 in a friendly match against South Korea, playing for 90 minutes before he was substituted in the injury time of the game. It would be Krešić's only appearance for the national side.

References

External links

 

1984 births
Living people
Sportspeople from Vukovar
Association football goalkeepers
Croatian footballers
Croatia youth international footballers
Croatia under-21 international footballers
Croatia international footballers
SV Eintracht Trier 05 players
Panionios F.C. players
PAOK FC players
FC Lokomotiv Moscow players
1. FSV Mainz 05 players
Bayer 04 Leverkusen players
AC Omonia players
2. Bundesliga players
Super League Greece players
Russian Premier League players
Bundesliga players
Cypriot First Division players
Croatian expatriate footballers
Expatriate footballers in Germany
Croatian expatriate sportspeople in Germany
Expatriate footballers in Russia
Croatian expatriate sportspeople in Russia
Expatriate footballers in Greece
Croatian expatriate sportspeople in Greece
Expatriate footballers in Cyprus
Croatian expatriate sportspeople in Cyprus